Varsity Fan Club  is a US boy band formed in Los Angeles, California in 2007.

Career 
The band, consisting of Drew Ryan Scott, David Lei Brandt, Bobby Edner, Jayk Purdy and Thomas Fiss, was formed through a band casting in 2007. Their first major performance was at the well-known Macy's Thanksgiving Day Parade in front of over 40 million television viewers, followed by an appearance on the ABC-Family series The Middleman. They then released their first single on Capitol Records entitled Future Love (written by Ryan Tedder and Evan Bogart; produced by the producers of OneRepublic) and ended up directly in Radio Disney's playlist and The N's video rotation. After a US tour as opening act for Rihanna, the Pussycat Dolls and Jesse McCartney in 2008 and 2009, the band parted ways with their former management and their record company . After this separation, Thomas Fiss departed as well. The band changed members and through another audition found Thomas "T.C." Carter to replace him. After a short finding phase, the band decided on a European management and worked on new songs and choreographies and prepared for their first tour in Europe. She also released a download single entitled Spank That which was promoted with both a video contest and a specially made up crap dance which she performed with Miley Cyrus. In the summer of 2010, Varsity Fanclub went on a three-month promotional tour in Germany, during which they also released their first physical single on the European market entitled I'm Your Guy. During this promotional tour, they appeared in television programs such as ZDF-Fernsehgarten or VIVA Live as well as at family festivals such as REWE Family or the Toggo Tour of Super RTL. 

In April 2011, the band parted ways with member Bobby Edner. In the summer of 2011, the band toured Germany again and completed numerous festival shows. In autumn 2011 the new single Opera and the debut album were released. In September 2011 the band parted ways with their German manager Philipp Hallenberger. In April 2012, David announced that he was no longer part of the band as he was going on a two-year tour as one of Lady Gaga's dancers. After David Lei Brandt and Bobby Edner split, Jayk, Drew and T.C. two new band members. They found this in early 2013 with Blake English and Devin Fox.

Members 
 Drew Ryan Scott (June 17, 1988) from Lafayette, Louisiana, is also a songwriter and producer, including for the Jonas Brothers (including Hey You) and Miley Cyrus (including the hit single Gonna Get This). He also lent his singing voice to actor Sterling Knight in the musical film StarStruck.
 Jayk Purdy (August 7, 1991) from Las Vegas, Nevada played in school bands since he was a little boy.
 Thomas "T.C." Carter (May 3, 1993) from Naples, Florida, won various dance competitions and was in commercials (including Nike, Microsoft, Nintendo) and the Nickelodeon teen series iCarly & Victorious. TC is new in the band since 2009 after Thomas Fiss left the band.
 Bobby Edner (October 5, 1988) from Los Angeles, California, played e.g. in TV series and films with (including Emergency Room, Charmed, A heavenly family , Mission 3D) and shot commercials (including Taco Bell, Dunkin Donuts, Axe).
 Thomas Fiss (December 7, 1986) from San Diego, California acted at the age of 12 in the musical "The Full Monty" in San Diego and on Broadway. He was a founding member and left the band in 2009.
 David Lei Brandt (November 29, 1986) from Evansville, Indiana, played among others in Pirates of the Caribbean - Pirates of the Caribbean 2 and is well known among youth in the US as the presenter of "Toontown" on the Disney Channel. He announced on April 12, 2012, via his Twitter account that he was no longer a member of Varsity Fanclub.

Discography 
 Future Love (2008; Capitol Records)
 Varsity Fan Club (album; 2009; Capitol Records)
 Spank That (2010)
 I'm Your Guy (2010; DA Music/Sony Music)

Awards 
 2011: Winner of the "Boyband 2011" award at Kindercampus
 2010: Children's campus award in the category "Super-Band 2010"

Web Links 

 Official Myspace
 Miss Hollywood – VFC conquer Germany
 
 Klatsch & Tratsch – New US boy band on the way to Germany

References

American boy bands